Janet Owusu (born  23 April 1991 in Accra) is a Ghanaian female footballer.

Career

Club 
Owusu started her career at the La Ladies FC in Accra. In the summer of 2014 she left Ghana for the first time and became the first Ghanaian in the Austrian ÖFB Women's League. On 20 July 2014, she signed for SV Neulengbach.

National Team 
Owusu took part in the Black Starlets at the FIFA U-20 Women's World Cup 2010 in Germany.

Since 2012 Owusu has been a national player of the Black Queens of Ghana.

References 

Living people
Ghana women's international footballers
1991 births
Ghanaian women's footballers

Women's association footballers not categorized by position
SV Neulengbach (women) players
ÖFB-Frauenliga players
Expatriate women's footballers in Austria
Ghanaian expatriate sportspeople in Austria
Ghanaian expatriate women's footballers